The Esso Cup is the Canadian national women's under-18 ice hockey club championship, sponsored by Esso. It is an annual event, sanctioned by Hockey Canada, that takes place each April.  The current champions are the Durham West Lightning, who won the 2022 Esso Cup in Okotoks, Alberta.

History
The forerunner to the Esso Cup was the Esso Women's Hockey Nationals, which was the Canadian senior women's championship from 1982 to 2008.  With the evolution of the Nationals into a professional tournament, Hockey Canada elected to discontinue it in 2008 and replace it with a national female midget championship known as the Esso Cup.

The inaugural Esso Cup was played in April 2009 in Calgary, Alberta.  The Westman Wildcats from Souris, Manitoba, were the first gold medalists.  The St. Albert Slash of Alberta are the only team to win the event multiple times.

Format
The Esso Cup follows Hockey Canada's standard six-team national championship format.  Branch champions compete in regional playoffs; the regional winners and a predetermined host team then compete for the national championship.  In years when not all regions have participated in the Esso Cup, another region has been allowed to send a second team to keep the field at six teams. The exception to this was in 2022 when regional playoffs were cancelled and all branch champions were promoted directly to the national championship.

The Esso Cup uses the IIHF points system for the round robin, which awards three points for a win in regulation time.  If the game is decided in overtime or a shootout, the winning team receives two points and the losing team receives one.  No points are awarded for losing a game in regulation time.  After the round robin is complete, the top four teams (by points) qualify for the playoff round.

Each year's gold medal game is televised nationally on TSN and RDS.

Winners and hosts

Notes

All-time results by region

As of 2018-19 season
Note: The Quebec region has not participated every year. In such years, a second team from another region has qualified in their place.

See also
Telus Cup
National Women's Under-18 Championship
Esso Women's Hockey Nationals

External links
Esso Cup Website

References

 
Hockey Canada
Ice hockey tournaments in Canada
Women's ice hockey competitions in Canada
Canadian ice hockey trophies and awards